Talli Kodukula Anubandham is a Telugu film released in 1982, starring Krishnam Raju, Jaya Pradha, K. R. Vijaya, Jaggayya, Kaikala Satyanarayana and others. The film was remade in Kannada as Chinnadantha Maga (1983), with Vishnuvardhan.

Cast
Krishnam Raju
Jaya Pradha
K. R. Vijaya
Jaggayya
Kaikala Satyanarayana

Soundtrack

References

External links
 

1981 films
1980s Telugu-language films
Indian drama films
Films directed by K. S. R. Das
Films scored by Satyam (composer)
Telugu films remade in other languages
1981 drama films